This is a list of 1984 British incumbents.

Government
 Monarch
 Head of State – Elizabeth II, Queen of the United Kingdom (1952–2022)
 Prime Minister
 Head of Government – Margaret Thatcher, Prime Minister of the United Kingdom (1979–1990)
First Lord of the Treasury
 Margaret Thatcher, First Lord of the Treasury (1979–1990)
Chancellor of the Exchequer
 Nigel Lawson, Chancellor of the Exchequer (1983–1989)
Second Lord of the Treasury
 Nigel Lawson, Second Lord of the Treasury (1983–1989)
Secretary of State for Foreign and Commonwealth Affairs
 Sir Geoffrey Howe, Secretary of State for Foreign and Commonwealth Affairs (1983–1989)
Secretary of State for the Home Department
 Leon Brittan, Secretary of State for the Home Department (1983–1985)
Secretary of State for Transport
 Nicholas Ridley, Secretary of State for Transport (1983–1986)
Secretary of State for Scotland
 George Younger, Secretary of State for Scotland (1979–1986)
Secretary of State for Social Services
 Norman Fowler, Secretary of State for Social Services (1981–1987)
Secretary of State for Northern Ireland
 James Prior, Secretary of State for Northern Ireland (1981–1984)
 Douglas Hurd, Secretary of State for Northern Ireland (1984–1985)
Secretary of State for Defence
 Michael Heseltine, Secretary of State for Defence (1983–1986)
Secretary of State for Trade and Industry
 Norman Tebbit, Secretary of State for Trade and Industry (1983–1985)
Secretary of State for Education and Science
 Sir Keith Joseph, Bt., Secretary of State for Education and Science (1981–1986)
Secretary of State for Wales
 Nicholas Edwards, Secretary of State for Wales (1979–1987)
Lord Privy Seal
 John Biffen, Lord Privy Seal (1983–1987)
Leader of the House of Commons
 John Biffen, Leader of the House of Commons (1982–1987)
Lord President of the Council
 William Whitelaw, 1st Viscount Whitelaw, Lord President of the Council (1983–1988)
Lord Chancellor
 Quintin Hogg, Baron Hailsham of St Marylebone, Lord Chancellor (1979–1987)
Chancellor of the Duchy of Lancaster
 Francis Cockfield, Baron Cockfield, Chancellor of the Duchy of Lancaster (1983–1984)
 Alexander Patrick Greysteil Ruthven, 2nd Earl of Gowrie, Chancellor of the Duchy of Lancaster (1984–1985)

Religion
 Archbishop of Canterbury
 Robert Runcie, Archbishop of Canterbury (1980–1991)
 Archbishop of York
 John Habgood, Archbishop of York (1983–1995)

1984
Leaders
British incumbents